Quest Aerospace is a company based in Cedar City, UT, United States, that designs and produces model rocket kits.

Quest Aerospace was founded in 1992 by Bill Stine (son of G. Harry Stine) in Pagosa Springs, Colorado, and produces model rocket kits for various skill levels of modelers, from the beginner to the most highly skilled. In 1995, ToyBiz (now Marvel Entertainment) acquired Quest along with Spectra Star, Inc. In 2003, Bill Stine purchased back Quest Aerospace from Marvel. In 2014, Quest Aerospace was purchased by RCS rocket motor components (Aerotech Consumer Aerospace) and was moved from Pagosa Springs, CO to Cedar City, Utah.

Quest's products include model rockets powered by standard 18 mm motors as well as smaller rockets powered by Micro Maxx motors. The company produces both 18 mm motors and Micro Maxx motors for use in its model rocket kits. Powered by compressed black powder motors, some of these rockets can achieve altitudes of over 2000 feet. Quest also produces a small line of midpowered rocket kits and is currently in the works of converting from black powder motors to Ammonium Perchlorate (AP) motors. These new motors are called Q-jets and are currently being sent in to the National Association of Rocketry for certification testing. Once the motors are certified, the new Q-jets will be available for purchase.

In early 2018, Quest Aerospace announced some of their Q-Jet rocket motors, A3's, and B4s, made of Ammonium perchlorate. These motors are now available on Quest Aerospace's website.

In popular culture

The name Quest Aerospace was used in the 2002 film Spider-Man, based on the Marvel Comics character of the same name. Quest was a competitor of Oscorp, the company owned by Norman Osborn (aka the Green Goblin). Quest was competing with Oscorp to sell an exoskeleton to the US Military, and after the Green Goblin destroyed it, the company restructured and was going to purchase Oscorp before the Goblin killed the Oscorp board of directors.

References

External links 
 Go to the Quest Aerospace Website

Companies based in Utah
1992 establishments in Colorado